Kevin Michael Gorey is an American epidemiologist and social worker. He is a professor in the School of Social Work at the University of Windsor in Ontario, Canada. He is known for his Canada-USA comparative research on cancer treatment access and survival. He has also published research showing that well endowed preschool interventions can increase children's IQ scores by an average of nearly 15 points.

Honors and awards
In 2002, Gorey received the article of the year award from School Psychology Quarterly. He was named a fellow of the American College of Epidemiology in 2006.

References

External links
Faculty page
Personal website

American emigrants to Canada
American epidemiologists
American social workers
Academic staff of University of Windsor
University at Buffalo alumni
Living people
People from El Paso, Texas
Cancer epidemiologists
Year of birth missing (living people)
Fellows of the American College of Epidemiology
21st-century American scientists
American expatriate academics